The United States Basketball Writers Association National Player of the Year Award is an award that has been presented by the United States Basketball Writers Association since the 1987–88 season to the top women's college basketball player in NCAA Division I.
Since 2012, the award has been named the Ann Meyers Drysdale Award in honor of the former UCLA four-time All-American player.

Winners

See also

 List of sports awards honoring women

External links
 Official website

References

Awards established in 1988
College basketball player of the year awards in the United States
Sports awards honoring women
College basketball trophies and awards in the United States